Forbes Johnston (3 August 1971 – 12 July 2007) was a Scottish professional footballer playing primarily in defence, but also spending some time in the midfield.

Life 
He started his career playing for junior side Musselburgh Athletic, and joined the professional ranks at Falkirk where he played from 1990 to 1996. He later joined Airdrieonians, where he played from 1996 to 2000. Forbes also represented his country in the Scotland under-21 team.

While playing football, Johnston studied for a law degree from the University of Edinburgh. When he was 28 he joined accountancy firm PricewaterhouseCoopers in Edinburgh after a knee injury ended his football career. He later moved to Sydney and then Adelaide, Australia. Johnston was found dead in his car on 12 July 2007, aged 35. According to the Adelaide police, he had committed suicide.

References

1971 births
2007 suicides
Scottish footballers
Falkirk F.C. players
Airdrieonians F.C. (1878) players
Scotland under-21 international footballers
Alumni of the University of Edinburgh
Association football midfielders